Eleotris melanosoma, the broadhead sleeper or dusky sleeper, is a species of fish in the family Eleotridae native to marine, fresh, and brackish waters from coastal eastern Africa through southern Asia to the islands of the western Pacific Ocean. It is of minor importance to local commercial fisheries. This species has been introduced to the Panama Canal Zone.

References

External links
 Photograph

melanosoma
Fish of Asia
Fish of Tanzania
Fish of South Africa
Taxa named by Pieter Bleeker
Fish described in 1852
Taxonomy articles created by Polbot